ITN is Independent Television News, a British news producer.

ITN may also refer to:

 Independent Television Network, a Sri Lankan broadcaster
 Iran TV Network (Canada)

Science and technology
 Integrated Transport Network, a British map dataset
 Interplanetary Transport Network, a set of gravitational pathways
 TomTom Itinerary file extension (.ITN)

Other uses
 Initial Training Network, Marie Curie Actions research fellowship program
 In the Nursery, a musical group, with the label ITN Corporation
 Insecticide treated net, a type of mosquito net
 Integrated Tactical Network, a US Army network
 Internal Transaction Number
 There Is Such A People (Ima takav narod), Bulgarian political party